Meert is a surname. Notable people with the surname include:

Henri Meert (1920–2006), Belgian footballer
Michael Meert (born 1953), German film director
Pieter Meert ( 1620–1669), Flemish Baroque painter
Stijn Meert (born 1978), Belgian footballer and manager
Joseph Meert (1905 - 1989), American artist 
 Joseph Meert (born 1957), American geologist

See also
Mert (given name)